Kolokuma/Opokuma is a Local Government Area of Bayelsa State, Nigeria. Its headquarters are in the town of Kaiama. Much of the area of the LGA is occupied by the Bayelsa National Forest.
 
It has an area of 361 km and a population of 77,292 at the 2006 census.

Climate

The postal code of the area is 560.

References

Local Government Areas in Bayelsa State